Two ships of the United States Navy have borne the name USS Billfish, after the billfish.

 , was a Balao-class submarine, commissioned in 1943 and struck in 1968.
 , was a Sturgeon-class submarine, commissioned in 1971 and struck in 1999.

References

United States Navy ship names